Károly Németh (14 December 1922 –  12 March 2008) was a Hungarian political figure born in Páka. He served as the chairman of the Hungarian Presidential Council from 25 June 1987 to 29 June 1988.

References 
 Népszabadság Online 2008. március 13. (MTI)

1922 births
2008 deaths
People from Zala County
Hungarian Communist Party politicians
Members of the Hungarian Working People's Party
Members of the Hungarian Socialist Workers' Party
Presidents of Hungary
Members of the National Assembly of Hungary (1958–1963)
Members of the National Assembly of Hungary (1963–1967)
Members of the National Assembly of Hungary (1967–1971)
Members of the National Assembly of Hungary (1971–1975)
Members of the National Assembly of Hungary (1980–1985)
Members of the National Assembly of Hungary (1985–1990)